Tottenham Grammar School (TGS) was  a renowned grammar school in North London, with local football connections.

History
A Tottenham grammar school had existed for centuries. Its origins are unclear, possibly dating back to 1456 but in 1631 a legacy was left by Sarah, Duchess of Somerset to extend the existing school house and provide free education to poor children from Tottenham.

Tottenham Hotspur
In 1882, pupils from the school and from St John's Presbyterian School formed Hotspur F.C. at All Hallows' Church. The name came from the Hotspur Cricket Club, of which boys from the school were members. This football club subsequently became Tottenham Hotspur F.C.

Former building
In 1910, the old school was knocked down apart from the Masters House (later to be destroyed by bombs in World War II). The new building on Somerset Road, built by Middlesex County Council, was used as the school until 1937. The new building was opened by Algernon Seymour, 15th Duke of Somerset on 12 October 1910, and cost £10,327. The school had four houses - Somerset, Morley, Bruce and Howard.

In 1971 it became the Education Department of Haringey Council.

New building
On 26 February 1938 due to increased numbers at the school, a site was opened on Creighton Road near White Hart Lane by Middlesex County Council. It housed 450 boys. In the early part of the war, at the time of the Blitz, the boys were evacuated to Chelmsford, to be taught at King Edward's Grammar School in the afternoons. The boys lived around the village of Writtle, west of Chelmsford; some also went to Hatfield Peverel, specifically Hatfield Peverel Priory.

From 1941, once the Blitz had finished (10 May 1941). An Army Cadet Corps was formed, along with an Air Training Corps in 1942 - 1571 Squadron, now known as Aylward Squadron.

V2 explosion
On 15 March 1945, a V-2 rocket landed on the corner of White Hart Lane and Queen Street, killing two fourth-year boys, with another losing his right arm.

New buildings
In 1960 new buildings opened for the sixth form and laboratories. By this time the school had 700 boys.

Comprehensive
In 1967 the school merged with the Rowland Hill Secondary Modern School in Lordship Lane, which was named after Sir Arthur Rowland Hill and had opened in 1938, to form the Somerset School, a voluntary-controlled boys' comprehensive school. The school's houses were now Baxter, Coleraine, Drayton and Hill.

Due to falling numbers this school closed in 1988, by which time it was situated on one site on White Hart Lane. The Lower School was demolished to become a housing estate on Somerset Close. The Upper School was demolished in 1989, becoming a housing estate on Somerset Gardens, and a site for Middlesex University - halls of residence for the Tottenham Campus, which closed in 2005 (the former St Katharine's College teacher training college).

Foundation
The sale of the school provided £9.1 million, which was used to set up a charitable foundation, the Tottenham Grammar School Foundation.

Notable former pupils

 George Petros Efstathiou, Professor of Astrophysics University of Cambridge
 Martin Benson (actor)
 Peter Lyster (marketeer)
 Prof James A. Beckford
 Sir Patrick Bishop, Conservative MP from 1950 to 1964 for Harrow Central
 David V. Day, British theologian, teacher, and former Principal of St John's College, Durham
 Eric Deakins, Labour MP from 1970 to 1974 for Walthamstow West, and from 1974 to 1987 for Walthamstow 
 Sir Archibald Forster, Chairman and Chief Executive from 1983 to 1993 of Esso UK, Manager from 1964 to 1969 of the Fawley Refinery, and President from 1985 to 1986 of the Institution of Chemical Engineers, and from 1988 to 1990 of the Institute of Petroleum
 Ralph Harris, Baron Harris of High Cross, Head from 1957 to 1988 of the Institute of Economic Affairs
 Prof William James, Professor of Botany from 1959 to 1967 at Imperial College London
 Gary Lefley, general secretary for the Campaign for Nuclear Disarmament
 Adrian Love, radio DJ
 Dr Geoff Manning CBE, physicist, and Director from 1979 to 1986 of the Rutherford Appleton Laboratory
 John Mastel CVO CBE, police officer
 Sir Alec Merrison, physicist and Vice-Chancellor from 1969 to 1984 of the University of Bristol
 Mick Newmarch, Chief Executive from 1990 to 1995 of Prudential Corporation plc
 Laurence Payne, actor known for Sexton Blake (TV series)
 Roy Perry, Conservative MEP from 1999 to 2004 for South East England, and father of Caroline Nokes
 Sir Leslie Plummer, Labour MP from 1951 to 1963 for Deptford
 Arthur Blaikie Purvis, Canadian industrialist and war purchasing agent
 Geoffrey Roe, Director-General from 1991 to 1995 of Defence Contracts at the MoD
 Sir Owen Williams, civil engineer who designed the first section of the M1
 Mike Winters, comedian (Mike & Bernie Winters)
 Anthony Bailey, Channel Swimmer, Swam the English Channel using Breaststroke on September 7, 2014 in 25hrs 56min. The 11th person to complete this swim using this stroke since Captain Matthew Webb in 1875. There were 2 previous attempts by Anthony in 2007 and 2012.

Other "Tottenham" schools
 Tottenham County School, a co-educational grammar school on Selby Road - became Tottenham School in 1967, then White Hart Lane School in 1983 when it merged with the Wood Green Comprehensive School
 Tottenham High School for Girls on High Road, became the High Cross Girls' School in 1967

References

External links
 Tottenham Grammar School Foundation

Defunct grammar schools in England
Boys' schools in London
Defunct schools in the London Borough of Haringey
Tottenham Hotspur F.C.
1631 establishments in England
Educational institutions established in the 1630s
Educational institutions disestablished in 1988
Explosions in London
Buildings and structures in the United Kingdom destroyed during World War II
1988 disestablishments in England
Grammar School